The seventh running of the Tour of Flanders cycling classic was held on Sunday, 18 March 1923. Swiss rider Heiri Suter won the race in a three-man sprint with Belgians Charles Deruyter and Albert Dejonghe. Suter became the first non-Belgian winner of the Tour of Flanders. 43 of 86 riders finished.

Route

The race started and finished in Ghent – totaling 243 km. The course featured two categorized climbs:
 Tiegemberg
 Kwaremont

Results

References

Tour of Flanders
1923 in road cycling
1923 in Belgian sport
March 1923 sports events